Robert McSkimming may refer to:

Bobby McSkimming (born 1956), Scottish footballer for Queen's Park, Brisbane Lions 
Bob McSkimming (1864–1924), Scottish footballer for Stoke
Robert McSkimming (footballer, born 1885) (1885–1952), Scottish footballer for Albion Rovers, Sheffield Wednesday, Motherwell